The Stony Plain Eagles are a senior ice hockey team based in Stony Plain, Alberta, Canada.  Founded in the 1930s, the team moved up to the Senior AAA ranks in 1992 and played in the Allan Cup Hockey West until 2020. They are the 1999 Allan Cup National Senior Champions of Canada.

History
In 1987, the Eagles would win both the Alberta and Western Canada Intermediate "A" Championship, but lost the Hardy Cup Intermediate National Championship in straight games to Miramichi Gagnon Packers.

From 1992 until 2003, the Eagles captured twelve consecutive Alberta Senior AAA Provincial Championships and reached six Allan Cup finals.  They won one title, as the host team, in 1999.

The Eagles hosted the Allan Cup in 2007, the third time since 1992.

Season-by-season record
''Note: GP = Games played, W = Wins, L = Losses, T = Ties, OTL = Overtime losses, Pts = Points, GF = Goals for, GA = Goals against

NHL alumni
Gordon Mark
Ryan Smyth
 James Black

See also
List of ice hockey teams in Alberta

References

Eagles history @ stonyplaineagles.com
Provincial Championships @ hockey-alberta.ca

External links

Ice hockey teams in Alberta
Senior ice hockey teams